George Elon White (March 7, 1848 – May 17, 1935) was a U.S. Representative from Illinois.

Born in Millbury, Massachusetts, White attended the public schools. During the Civil War he enlisted as a private in the Fifty-seventh Regiment, Massachusetts Veteran Volunteers. After the end of the war, White entered a commercial college in Worcester, Massachusetts. He moved to Chicago, Illinois, in 1867, where he engaged in the lumber business and also became interested in banking. He also served as member of the board of aldermen of Chicago, and served as member of the Illinois State Senate from 1878 to 1886.

White was elected as a Republican to the Fifty-fourth and Fifty-fifth Congresses (March 4, 1895 – March 3, 1899). He was an unsuccessful candidate for reelection in 1898 to the Fifty-sixth Congress. He then resumed his former business pursuits in Chicago, Illinois, and served as president of the White Lumber Co. White died in Chicago, Illinois, on May 17, 1935; he was interred in the mausoleum in Rosehill Cemetery.

References

1848 births
1935 deaths
Burials at Rosehill Cemetery
People from Millbury, Massachusetts
Union Army soldiers
Republican Party members of the United States House of Representatives from Illinois
Republican Party Illinois state senators
Chicago City Council members